Montenotte was a department of the First French Empire in present-day Italy. It was named after the village Montenotte near Savona to commemorate the Battle of Montenotte in 1796. It was formed in 1805, when the Ligurian Republic (formerly the Republic of Genoa) was annexed directly to France. Its capital was Savona.

The department was disbanded after the defeat of Napoleon in 1814. It was followed by a brief restoration of the Ligurian Republic, but at the Congress of Vienna the old territory of Genoa was awarded to the Kingdom of Sardinia. Its territory is now divided between the Italian provinces of Savona, Alessandria, Imperia and Cuneo.

Subdivision
The department was subdivided into the following arrondissements and cantons (situation in 1812):

 Savona, cantons: Cairo, Finale, Pietra, Noli, Quiliano, Sassello, Savona and Varazze.
 Acqui, cantons: Acqui, Castelletto d'Orba, Dego, Incisa, Nizza Monferrato, Santo Stefano Belbo, Spigno and Visone.
 Ceva, cantons: Calizzano, Ceva, Dogliani, Garessio, Millesimo, Murazzano, Ormea and Saliceto.
 Porto Maurizio, cantons: Alassio, Albenga, Borgomaro, Diano Marina, Oneglia, Pieve di Teco, Porto Maurizio and Santo Stefano.
 
Its population in 1812 was 289,823, and its area was 393,798 hectares.

References

Former departments of France in Italy
1805 establishments in the First French Empire